Bodø Air Traffic Control Center or Bodø ATCC en route air traffic control unit located at Bodø Airport in Bodø, in North Norway.

The ATCC has a total of 36 airports under its area of responsibility (AoR) - 13 controlled and 23 uncontrolled, regional airports - including Svalbard Airport, Longyear. It is divided into a total of 6 sectors; 5 en route sectors (including 1 oceanic) and 1 approach sector. The ATCC employs about 50 air traffic controllers and about 30 assistants.

Air traffic control centers
Air traffic control in Norway
Avinor